Balhara may refer to:

People 
 Sanchit Balhara, Indian film-score composer
 Nilesh Balhara, Indian kurash competitor at the 2014 Asian Beach Games
 Pincky Balhara, Indian kurash wrestler
 Ravindra Balhara, Indian competitor in the 2013 Super Fight League events

Other uses 
 Balhara (title), the Arabic form of the name of a royal title used in parts of mediaeval India

See also 
 Balara (disambiguation)
 Belhara, in eastern Nepal
 Vallabha (disambiguation)